This article lists air bases currently operated or used by the Syrian Arab Air Force. During the Syrian Civil War some bases were captured by rebels forces.

Military airbases

See also
 List of airports in Syria
 Syrian Arab Air Force
 Military of Syria

Notes

References

External links
Syrian Air Force  at Scramble Magazine - Dutch Aviation Society

Airports in Syria
Syrian Air Force bases
Syria
Air Force bases
Air Force bases